Sherri Michelle Saum (born October 1, 1974) is an American actress. Saum is best known for her co-lead role as Lena Adams Foster in the Freeform drama series The Fosters (2013–2018) as well as a subsequent guest star role in its spinoff Good Trouble (2019–present). She is also known for her television roles in Beggars and Choosers, Rescue Me, In Treatment and Locke & Key, as well as for her roles in the daytime soap operas Sunset Beach and One Life to Live.

Early life
Saum was born in Dayton, Ohio, to a German mother and an African-American father. She got her start at a Model Search America convention near her home in Kettering, Ohio. She was discovered during high school, modeling mostly during summer breaks until she moved to New York to work full-time with the NY modeling agency Images Management. Saum attended Ohio State University in Columbus, and New York University in New York.

Career

Saum began her acting career in the NBC daytime soap opera, Sunset Beach as Vanessa Hart, during the entire run of the series, from 1997 to 1999. In 1999 she received a Daytime Emmy Award nomination for Outstanding Younger Actress in a Drama Series for her role in the show. Later in 1999, Saum was cast as a series regular in the Showtime comedy-drama series Beggars and Choosers (1999–2000), and guest-starred on Girlfriends, and Charmed. From August 31, 2001, to September 16, 2003, Saum had her second daytime television role in the ABC soap, One Life to Live, as Keri Reynolds.

From 2006 to 2007, Saum played the role of Natalie in the FX drama series Rescue Me. She appeared in the Hallmark Television film Relative Stranger with Cicely Tyson and Eriq La Salle. She also appeared in the independent film Ten Stories Tall with Ally Sheedy and Josh Hamilton. In 2009 she played the series regular role of Bess in Season 2 of the HBO drama series In Treatment. The next few years she had guest-starring roles in CW's Gossip Girl, CBS's Unforgettable, ABC's Body of Proof and Revenge. In 2011, Saum was cast as the lead character of the ABC drama pilot Grace (written by Krista Vernoff), opposite Abigail Spencer and Eric Roberts, but the show was not picked up.

In 2012, Saum was cast along with Teri Polo in the lead roles of the Jennifer Lopez-produced drama series The Fosters for ABC Family. The series premiered on June 3, 2013. The series ended in 2018 after five seasons. She reprised her role in its spinoff, Good Trouble in 2019. While on hiatus from The Fosters, she took various guest starring roles in network dramas. In 2014, she guest starred in the NBC legal drama Law & Order: Special Victims Unit, where her real-life pregnancy was incorporated into the plot. In 2015 she guested in the ABC series, How to Get Away with Murder and “The Mysteries of Laura”. In 2016 she guested on “Code Black” on CBS and in 2018 on the TNT adventure series “The Librarians”.
After The Fosters ended, Sherri played the adult Regina Louise in the biographical feature “I Am Somebody’s Child: The Regina Louise Story” and joined the ABC Marvel sci-fi series “Agents of S.H.I.E.L.D.” for three episodes.

In 2019, Saum co-starred opposite Jessica Biel in the Facebook Watch drama series Limetown. Earlier that year, she was cast as Heather Hemmens' character's mother Mimi DeLuca in the CW series, Roswell, New Mexico. In early 2019, Saum was cast in a series recurring role in the Netflix fantasy drama series, Locke & Key playing the role of Ellie Whedon, a teacher at Matheson Academy who has a mysterious history with the Locke family. Filming in Toronto and Lunenburg, Canada, through the spring and summer of 2019, she split her time, flying home to her family in Los Angeles frequently. Later in 2019, she returned to Toronto for two episodes of the Starz thriller “Condor” as Senator Thrush.
Seasons 2 & 3 of Locke & Key filmed consecutively and because of COVID-19 pandemic restrictions, Sherri spent several months in 2021 in Canada filming her season 2 (recurring) and season 3 (series regular) episodes. That year she also returned to Good Trouble and guested as Paula Matarazzo in the Starz franchise Power Book II: Ghost.
 In March 2022 Sherri returned to Law & Order: Special Victims Unit in a different role than she had played almost exactly 8 years earlier. The same week she appeared again as state politician and vivid sexter Lena Adams Foster on Good Trouble.

Personal life
On May 19, 2007, Saum married longtime boyfriend and former One Life to Live castmate Kamar de los Reyes in New York City. On December 3, 2013, Saum's rep announced that the couple were expecting twins; the children were born in 2014. In addition, Saum is the stepmom of de los Reyes’ son.

Filmography

Film

Television

References

External links

 
 

1974 births
Living people
African-American actresses
American film actresses
American soap opera actresses
American television actresses
American people of German descent
Actresses from Dayton, Ohio
American female models
New York University alumni
Ohio State University alumni
20th-century American actresses
21st-century American actresses
20th-century African-American women
20th-century African-American people
21st-century African-American women
21st-century African-American people